August Friedrich von Pauly (9 May 1796, in Benningen am Neckar – 2 May 1845, in Stuttgart) was a German educator and classical philologist.

From 1813 to 1818 he studied at the University of Tübingen, then furthered his education at Heidelberg as a student of Georg Friedrich Creuzer. Beginning in 1822, he served as rector of the Latin school in Biberach, followed by work as a gymnasium professor in Heilbronn (1828). From 1830 until his death in 1845, he was an educator at the gymnasium in Stuttgart.

In 1837 began the first edition of the classical encyclopedia "Realencyclopädie der classischen Altertumswissenschaft", whose later editions are commonly known as the Pauly–Wissowa. Pauly died prior to publication of the fourth volume of the initial edition. After his death, edition of the encyclopedia was continued by Ernst Christian Walz and Wilhelm Siegmund Teuffel (first edition 1837–1852, six volumes). He also published an edition involving the works of the Greek satirist, Lucian of Samosata, called "Lucians Werke" (1827–1832).

References

External links
 
 

1796 births
1845 deaths
German philologists
German antiquarians
German encyclopedists
People from the Duchy of Württemberg
University of Tübingen alumni
German male non-fiction writers